Folman is a surname. Notable people with the surname include:

Ari Folman (born 1962), Israeli film director, film score composer, animator, and screenwriter
Lola Folman (1908–1979), Polish singer and composer

See also
Felman
Folan
Polman